David Christopherson (born October 5, 1954) is a Canadian politician. From 2004 until 2019, he represented the riding of Hamilton Centre in the House of Commons of Canada. He previously served in the Legislative Assembly of Ontario from 1990 to 2003, and was a cabinet minister in the provincial government of Bob Rae. Christopherson is a member of the New Democratic Party.

Early life and career

Christopherson was born in Hamilton, Ontario. He is self-educated, having dropped out of high school in the ninth grade. A voracious reader, he is a particular fan of books on politics. He began working with International Harvester in Hamilton at age 19, and remained with the company for eleven years. He was active with the United Auto Workers union, becoming plant chairman in 1978 and president of the Local 525 in 1979.

Christopherson campaigned in Hamilton East in the 1984 federal election, finishing second against Liberal candidate Sheila Copps. He was elected to Hamilton, Ontario City Council the following year for the city's fourth ward, and re-elected in 1988. Christopherson became chairman of Hamilton's licensing committee, and made a concerted effort to reform the city's notorious regulatory practices.  He developed a reputation on as a hard worker, and was one of three councillors to decline a pay increase in 1988.

Christopherson was also a constituency assistant for NDP Member of Parliament (MP) Ian Deans in the mid-1980s.  He sought the NDP nomination for Hamilton Mountain after Deans's retirement in 1986, but lost to Marion Dewar.

Provincial politics

Government backbencher

Christopherson was elected to the Ontario legislature in the 1990 provincial election, defeating Liberal cabinet minister Lily Oddie Munro in Hamilton Centre as the NDP won a majority government across the province.  He was chair of caucus and parliamentary assistant to Provincial Treasurer Floyd Laughren from 1990 to 1992.

Cabinet minister

Christopherson was respected by all parties for his legislative work ethic and contributions to the Standing Committee on Finance and Economic Affairs, and was widely considered as one of the most skilled backbenchers in the government caucus.  There was little surprise when he was appointed to cabinet as Minister of Correctional Services on September 23, 1992, notwithstanding that Hamilton already had three representatives in cabinet.

Christopherson's portfolio was extremely challenging, and was described by one journalist as "one of the worst jobs in government".  The Correctional Services ministry had previously been damaged by reports of sexual abuse and intimidation involving staff at Ontario jails and training centres, and Christopherson was required to enact substantial internal reforms.  He supported former NDP leader Stephen Lewis's recommendations on race relations in the criminal justice system, and made efforts to address racism in Ontario prisons.

On February 3, 1993, Christopherson was given additional cabinet responsibilities as Solicitor General of Ontario.  This was also a difficult portfolio, and Christopherson has since acknowledged that relations between the Rae government and Ontario police services were extremely tense when he entered the ministry. He has been credited with improving this situation, winning the respect of many in the police community. Julian Fantino, then an executive member of the Ontario Association of Chiefs of Police, commented that there was "marked improvement" in relations following Christopherson's appointment.

Christopherson allowed semi-automatic weapons to be issued to officers in late 1993.  This was supported by many in the police service, but was criticized by some in the legal community on the grounds that the new weapons were not safer than the .38 models they replaced.  Christopherson also introduced new guidelines for targeting hate crimes, and mandated stricter standards for police investigations of spousal assault.  Early in 1995, he announced that police would soon be given the right to warn the general public about sex offenders released into residential neighbourhoods.

In May 1994, Christopherson introduced a pilot project to reduce illegal gun ownership in Ontario. For a three-month period, Ontarians were permitted to turn over illegal or unwanted firearms to the police without risking prosecution for illegal possession. The policy was endorsed by the police community.  After three months, the ministry announced that 1,000 pistols and revolvers, 2,000 rifles and shotguns and over 150,000 rounds of ammunition had been turned over to the police.

In addition to his official cabinet portfolios, Christopherson was also responsible for articulating the Rae government's strategy for the proposed Red Hill Creek Expressway in Hamilton. Although he had previously opposed the project for environmental and other reasons, Christopherson argued in 1994 that a scaled-back four-lane highway would be the "best possible compromise" under the circumstances.  The Rae government approved the plan, although it was later rejected by the succeeding ministry.

Christopherson was widely respected for his abilities in cabinet, and often won praise from members of the opposition. Progressive Conservative Bob Runciman credited him for his competence and managerial skills, while Liberal Tim Murphy described him as "the best of a bad bunch".  He served until the defeat of the Rae government in 1995.

Cabinet positions

Opposition member

The Rae government was defeated in the 1995 election, falling to only seventeen seats out of 130. Christopherson, still personally popular, was narrowly re-elected for Hamilton Centre. He served in the next legislature as NDP critic for labour issues and the Workers' Compensation Board.

Rae resigned as party leader in 1996, and there was considerable media speculation that Christopherson would run to succeed him.  Toronto Star journalist Thomas Walkom indicated that he would be a powerful candidate on the centrist wing of the party, and would likely win the support of pro-Rae trade unions such as the Steelworkers.  He decided against running and gave his support to Howard Hampton, the eventual winner.

Christopherson was a prominent supporter of Hamilton's amalgamation with neighbouring municipalities in the late 1990s.  The policy, which was supported by some members of all three major parties, was enacted by the Progressive Conservative government of Mike Harris in 2000.  Christopherson considered leaving politics to run for the leadership of the Ontario Federation of Labour in 1997, but ultimately declined.

The Hamilton Centre riding was eliminated by redistribution in 1996, and Christopherson chose to contest the expanded riding of Hamilton West for the 1999 provincial election against incumbent Progressive Conservative Lillian Ross. He was re-elected, and became one of only nine New Democrats returned to the reduced 103-seat legislature.  He served as his party's Finance and Labour Critic, and was appointed as House Leader.  He considered campaigning for Mayor of Hamilton in 2000, but reluctantly declined.

Christopherson resigned as NDP House Leader in 2001, amid rumours of a rift with Hampton.  He continued to serve as his party's critic for Consumer and Business Services and the Management Board of Cabinet, and was a deputy speaker in the legislature from 2001 to 2003.

Mayoral campaign

Christopherson did not seek re-election to the legislature in 2003. He instead campaigned for mayor of Hamilton in that year's municipal campaign.  He promised to reform the city's disclosure laws, requiring municipal politicians to declare their assets, debts and holdings.  He also spoke out against plans to build an incinerator in the city for waste disposal.  He was supported by two teachers' unions and the city firefighters' union, as well as by Liberal MPP Dominic Agostino from Hamilton East. Initially considered the frontrunner, he was ultimately defeated by rival candidate Larry Di Ianni.  Hamilton's amalgamation with the more right-leaning suburbs was a factor, as was Christopherson's opposition to a revised Red Hill Expressway.

Federal politician

Christopherson returned to political life a few months later, defeating Liberal cabinet minister Stan Keyes to win the Hamilton Centre riding in the 2004 federal election. The Liberal Party won a minority government, and Christopherson served as NDP critic for cities, community infrastructure, labour and steel policy in the 38th parliament.  He was part of a Canadian delegation that observed presidential elections in Ukraine in late 2004.

He was re-elected in the 2006 federal election with an increased majority, as the Conservatives won a minority government nationally. In May 2006, he called for the Royal Canadian Mounted Police rather than the government to investigate a leak of the Auditor General's report into the Canadian gun registry.  Christopherson suspected that someone connected to the government may have been responsible for the leak, given its "self-serving" nature.  He has also criticized the previous Liberal government for allowing billions in unpaid tax monies to remain uncollected.

Christopherson was re-elected to his federal seat again in the 2008 federal election, and the 2011 federal election.

Christopherson is often described as a pragmatic politician.  He once said that he has never been a "hard-line ideologue", but "the NDP is where I'm most comfortable."

He was appointed Defence Critic for the NDP after Jack Layton's death, and appointed one of the three deputy leaders, by Layton's successor Thomas Mulcair.

After the 2015 federal election, Christopherson was appointed as the NDP's critic for the Planning and Priorities Committee and for Public Safety and Emergency Preparedness.

Christopherson was involved in the so-called 'Elbowgate' political confrontation on 18 May 2016.  Video of the floor of the House of Commons appears to show the MP moving from side to side impeding the path of Conservative whip, Gord Brown MP.

Planned retirement

On July 5, 2018, Christopherson announced his plan to retire at the end of the 42nd Canadian Parliament, and to not seek re-election in the 2019 federal election.

"It has been my distinct honour to have served as the councillor for Ward 4, the Member of Provincial Parliament for Hamilton Centre and now as the federal Member of Parliament for Hamilton Centre," Christopherson wrote in his statement. "I truly love our city and the people who call it home. To have earned the trust and confidence of the people of Hamilton for so many years is truly humbling and I am grateful to have had the opportunity to join with so many dedicated people working to help build a stronger, more fair and diverse community."

Electoral record

|-
!rowspan="2" colspan="2"|Candidate
!colspan="3"|Popular vote
|-
! Votes
! %
! ±%
|-
| style="background-color:#FF0000;" |
| style="text-align:left;" | Larry DiIanni
| style="text-align:right;" |70,539
| style="text-align:right;" |50.92%
| style="text-align:right;" | -
|-
| style="background-color:#FF7F00;" |
| style="text-align:left;" | David Christopherson
| style="text-align:right;" |54,298
| style="text-align:right;" |39.20%
| style="text-align:right;" | -
|-
| style="background-color:#2F9C95;" |
| style="text-align:left;" | Dick Wildeman
| style="text-align:right;" |4,462
| style="text-align:right;" |3.22%
| style="text-align:right;" | -
|-
| style="background-color:#939F5C;" |
| style="text-align:left;" | Michael Peters
| style="text-align:right;" |3,270
| style="text-align:right;" |2.36%
| style="text-align:right;" | -
|- 
| style="background-color:#8DB600;" |
| style="text-align:left;" | Tom Murray
| style="text-align:right;" |2,881
| style="text-align:right;" |2.08%
| style="text-align:right;" | -
|-
| style="background-color:#69359C;" |
| style="text-align:left;" | Michael Baldasaro
| style="text-align:right;" |2,569
| style="text-align:right;" |1.85%
| style="text-align:right;" |+0.75%
|-
| style="background-color:#ff1493;" |
| style="text-align:left;" | Matt Jelly
| style="text-align:right;" |510
| style="text-align:right;" |0.37%
| style="text-align:right;" | -
|-
| style="text-align:right;background-color:#FFFFFF;" colspan="2" |Total votes
| style="text-align:right;background-color:#FFFFFF;" |139,902
| style="text-align:right;background-color:#FFFFFF;" |37.97%
| style="text-align:right;background-color:#FFFFFF;" |
|- 
| style="text-align:right;background-color:#FFFFFF;" colspan="2" |Registered voters
| style="text-align:right;background-color:#FFFFFF;" |368,480
| style="text-align:right;background-color:#FFFFFF;" |100%
| style="text-align:right;background-color:#FFFFFF;" |
|- 
| style="text-align:left;" colspan="6" |Note: All Hamilton Municipal Elections are officially non-partisan.  Note: Candidate campaign colours are based on the prominent colour used in campaign items (signs, literature, etc.)and are used as a visual differentiation between candidates.
|- 
| style="text-align:left;" colspan="13" |Sources: 
|}

|-
!rowspan="2" colspan="2"|Candidate
!colspan="3" |Popular vote
|- 
! Votes
! %
! ±%
|-
| style="background-color:#FF0000;" |
| style="text-align:left;" | Geraldine Copps (incumbent)
| style="text-align:right;" |8,174
| style="text-align:right;" |69.38%
| style="text-align:right;" |n/a
|-
| style="background-color:#FF7F00;" |
| style="text-align:left;" | David Christopherson (incumbent)
| style="text-align:right;" |8,055
| style="text-align:right;" |68.38%
| style="text-align:right;" |n/a
|-
| style="background-color:#002E63;" |
| style="text-align:left;" | Bob Fanjoy
| style="text-align:right;" |2,319
| style="text-align:right;" |19.67%
| style="text-align:right;" |n/a
|-
| style="text-align:right;background-color:#FFFFFF;" colspan="2" |Total votes
| style="text-align:right;background-color:#FFFFFF;" |11,787
| style="text-align:right;background-color:#FFFFFF;" |Note 1
| style="text-align:right;background-color:#FFFFFF;" |
|- 
| style="text-align:right;background-color:#FFFFFF;" colspan="2" |Registered voters
| style="text-align:right;background-color:#FFFFFF;" |28,764
| style="text-align:right;background-color:#FFFFFF;" |40.90%
| style="text-align:right;background-color:#FFFFFF;" |n/a
|- 
| style="text-align:left;" colspan="6" |Note 1: Each ward elected two aldermen and percentages are specific to each candidate, not for the overall total.Note 2: All Hamilton Municipal Elections are officially non-partisan.  Note 3: Candidate campaign colours are based on the prominent colour used in campaign items (signs, literature, etc.)and are used as a visual differentiation between candidates.
|- 
| style="text-align:left;" colspan="13" |Sources: Benedetti, Paul. "Clean campaign for a dirty job in Ward 4", The Hamilton Spectator, November 15, 1988, Metro, B2.

|}

|-
!rowspan="2" colspan="2"|Candidate
!colspan="2"|Popular vote
!rowspan="2"| Elected?
|-
! Votes
! %
|-
| style="background-color:#FF0000;" |
| style="text-align:left;" | Geraldine Copps 
| style="text-align:right;" |5,992
| style="text-align:right;" |48.33%
| style="text-align:center;" |
|-
| style="background-color:#FF7F00;" |
| style="text-align:left;" | David Christopherson 
| style="text-align:right;" |4,958
| style="text-align:right;" |40%
| style="text-align:center;" |
|-
| style="background-color:#f6cca4;" |
| style="text-align:left;" | Don Gray (incumbent)
| style="text-align:right;" |3,069
| style="text-align:right;" |24.75%
| style="text-align:right;" |
|-
| style="background-color:#a4cff6;" |
| style="text-align:left;" | Vince Scott (incumbent)
| style="text-align:right;" |2,883
| style="text-align:right;" |23.25%
| style="text-align:right;" |
|-
| style="background-color:#30ad5d;" |
| style="text-align:left;" | John Ellis
| style="text-align:right;" |2,373
| style="text-align:right;" |19.14%
| style="text-align:right;" |
|-
| style="background-color:#3d30ad;" |
| style="text-align:left;" | Gaspare Bonomo
| style="text-align:right;" |878
| style="text-align:right;" |7.08%
| style="text-align:right;" |
|-
| style="background-color:#9c1e59;" |
| style="text-align:left;" | Larry Wheaton
| style="text-align:right;" |535
| style="text-align:right;" |4.32%
| style="text-align:right;" |
|-
| style="background-color:#c1c4b8;" |
| style="text-align:left;" | Bob Fanjoy
| style="text-align:right;" |289
| style="text-align:right;" |2.33%
| style="text-align:right;" |
|-
| style="text-align:right;background-color:#FFFFFF;" colspan="2" |Total votes
| style="text-align:right;background-color:#FFFFFF;" colspan="1" |12,398
| style="text-align:right;background-color:#FFFFFF;" colspan="2" |
|- 
| style="text-align:right;background-color:#FFFFFF;" colspan="2" |Registered voters
| style="text-align:right;background-color:#FFFFFF;" |
| style="text-align:right;background-color:#FFFFFF;" colspan="1" |
| style="text-align:left;background-color:#FFFFFF;" colspan="1" |
|- 
| style="text-align:left;" colspan="6" |Note 1: Each ward elected two aldermen and percentages are specific to each candidate, not for the overall total.Note 2: All Hamilton Municipal Elections are officially non-partisan.  Note 3: Candidate campaign colours are based on the prominent colour used in campaign items (signs, literature, etc.)and are used as a visual differentiation between candidates.
|- 
| style="text-align:left;" colspan="13" |Sources: Wilson, Paul. "That old Copps magic still works", Hamilton Spectator, November 13, 1985, A7.

|}

All federal election information is taken from Elections Canada.  All provincial election information is taken from Elections Ontario.  The 2003 municipal election results are taken from official results provided by the City of Hamilton, available here.  Italicized expenditures refer to submitted totals, and are presented when the final reviewed totals are not available.

The 1999 provincial expenditure entries are taken from official candidate reports as listed by Elections Ontario. The figures cited are the Total Candidate's Campaign Expenses Subject to Limitation, and include transfers from constituency associations.

References

External links

David Chistopherson, page on NDP website
How'd They Vote?: David Christopherson's voting history and quotes

1954 births
Living people
Members of the House of Commons of Canada from Ontario
New Democratic Party MPs
Ontario New Democratic Party MPPs
Hamilton, Ontario city councillors
Members of the Executive Council of Ontario
Trade unionists from Ontario
21st-century Canadian politicians